The Economists' statement opposing the Bush tax cuts was a statement signed by roughly 450 economists, including ten of the twenty-four American Nobel Prize laureates alive at the time, in February 2003 who urged the U.S. President George W. Bush not to enact the 2003 tax cuts; seeking and sought to gather public support for the position. The statement was printed as a full-page ad in The New York Times and released to the public through the Economic Policy Institute. According to the statement, the 450 plus economists who signed the statement believe that the 2003 Bush tax cuts will increase inequality and the budget deficit, decreasing the ability of the U.S. government to fund essential services, while failing to produce economic growth.

In rebuttal, 250 plus economists who supported the tax plan wrote that the new plan would "create more employment, economic growth, and opportunities for all Americans."

Content

The statement reads as follows:

Economic growth, though positive, has not been sufficient to generate jobs and prevent unemployment from rising. In fact,
there are now more than two million fewer private sector jobs than at the start of the current recession. Overcapacity,
corporate scandals, and uncertainty have and will continue to weigh down the economy.

The tax cut plan proposed by President Bush is not the answer to these problems. Regardless of how one views the specifics
of the Bush plan, there is wide agreement that its purpose is a permanent change in the tax structure and not the creation
of jobs and growth in the near-term. The permanent dividend tax cut, in particular, is not credible as a short-term stimulus.
As tax reform, the dividend tax cut is misdirected in that it targets individuals rather than corporations, is overly
complex, and could be, but is not, part of a revenue-neutral tax reform effort.

Passing these tax cuts will worsen the long-term budget outlook, adding to the nation’s projected chronic deficits. This
fiscal deterioration will reduce the capacity of the government to finance Social Security and Medicare benefits as well as
investments in schools, health, infrastructure, and basic research. Moreover, the proposed tax cuts will generate further
inequalities in after-tax income.

To be effective, a stimulus plan should rely on immediate but temporary spending and tax measures to expand demand,
and it should also rely on immediate but temporary incentives for investment. Such a stimulus plan would spur growth
and jobs in the short term without exacerbating the long-term budget outlook.

Signatories
Over 450 economists signed the statement, including the following eleven Nobel Prize Laureates:

George Akerlof, University of California – Berkeley
Kenneth J. Arrow, Stanford University
Peter Diamond, Massachusetts Institute of Technology
Lawrence R. Klein University of Pennsylvania
Daniel L. McFadden University of California – Berkeley
Franco Modigliani Massachusetts Institute of Technology
Douglass C. North Washington University
Paul A. Samuelson Massachusetts Institute of Technology
William F. Sharpe Stanford University
Robert M. Solow Massachusetts Institute of Technology
Joseph Stiglitz Columbia University

Response

The letter provoked a response from 250 signatories who supported the Bush tax cuts. Signatories of the rebuttal letter included:

Annelise Anderson Stanford University
James T. Bennett George Mason University
Martin Feldstein Harvard University
Joel W. Hay University of Southern California
Robert J. Hodrick Columbia University
Michael C. Jensen Harvard Business School
Burton Malkiel Princeton University
Gregory Mankiw Harvard University
Carmen M. Reinhart International Monetary Fund
Vernon L. Smith George Mason University (Nobel Laureate)
Richard E. Wagner George Mason University
Steven N. Kaplan University of Chicago
Edward C. Prescott University of Minnesota (Nobel Laureate)

References

George W. Bush administration controversies
2003 in the United States
2003 in politics
Political statements
History of taxation in the United States
2003 documents